Oregon Route 260 (OR 260) is an Oregon state highway running from the west side of Grants Pass to US 199 near Grants Pass. OR 260 is known as the Rogue River Loop Highway No. 260 (see Oregon highways and routes).

OR 260 was established in 2003 as part of Oregon's project to assign route numbers to highways that previously were not assigned.

Route description 

OR 260 begins at an intersection with Upper River Road at Grants Pass and heads west and north along the Rogue River before crossing the river and heading south to an intersection with US 199 approximately five miles southwest of Grants Pass, where it ends.

History 

OR 260 was assigned to the Rogue River Loop Highway in 2003.

Major intersections

References 
 Oregon Department of Transportation, Descriptions of US and Oregon Routes, https://web.archive.org/web/20051102084300/http://www.oregon.gov/ODOT/HWY/TRAFFIC/TEOS_Publications/PDF/Descriptions_of_US_and_Oregon_Routes.pdf, page 22.
 Oregon Department of Transportation, Rogue River Loop Highway No. 260, ftp://ftp.odot.state.or.us/tdb/trandata/maps/slchart_pdfs_1980_to_2002/Hwy260_2001.pdf

260
Transportation in Josephine County, Oregon